Gareth Rohan Breese (born 9 January 1976) is a West Indian cricketer. Born in Montego Bay, St James, Jamaica, he attended Wolmer's Boys School in Kingston. Breese played as a right arm offspinner.

Career
He played one Test match in 2002, as a spin bowler in Chennai against India. Breese scored five runs in two innings, and took two wickets, but conceded 135 runs in 31 overs.

Breese featured for over 100 first class games for Jamaica and Durham. He played for Durham from 2004 until 2014, qualifying as a non-overseas player due to owning a British passport. With 31 wickets, he was the third highest wicket-taker for Durham in 2005, as the team was promoted from Division Two in the County Championship. As a batsman he hit several half-centuries, at number seven and eight in the batting order, which helped Durham to several victories, such as an unbeaten 79 at Taunton as Durham chased 243 to win after Breese had come in at 98 for 4.

With Durham Breese went on to win the 2007 Friends Provident Trophy by a margin of 125 runs over Hampshire in the final at Lord's. He also scored the winning runs for Durham in the 2014 Royal London One-Day Cup final against Warwickshire at Lord's in what was his final appearance with the club.

See also
One Test Wonder

References

External links
 

1976 births
Living people
Cricketers at the 1998 Commonwealth Games
Durham cricketers
Jamaican cricketers
Northumberland cricketers
West Indies Test cricketers
Jamaica cricketers
Jamaican people of British descent
Commonwealth Games competitors for Jamaica